The Northern Cyprus national basketball team is the basketball team of Northern Cyprus. The team is not affiliated to FIBA, so only plays friendly games.

History
Northern Cyprus's first match was played on 25 January 2006, against Kyrgyzstan. The team won by 84–78.

In May 2015, the team played two matches against Abkhazia national team in Northern Cyprus, invited by the TRNC Federation. The team won their second match by 59–47, while the third match was cancelled.

In 2021, the team played two friendly matches against Kyrgyzstan. Northern Cyprus won the first of them.

Matches

See also
Sport in Northern Cyprus

References

European national teams not affiliated to FIBA
Basketball in Northern Cyprus